Budgie may refer to:

Arts
 Budgie (album), the debut album by the Welsh heavy metal band Budgie
 Budgie (band), a Welsh heavy metal band from Cardiff
 Budgie (musician) (born 1957), English drummer
 Budgie (TV series), a British television series starring popstar Adam Faith
 Budgie the Little Helicopter, a British animated television series

Other
 Budgerigar (also budgie), a small, long-tailed, seed-eating parrot
 Budgie (desktop environment), a desktop environment that currently uses GNOME technologies
 Budgie Toys, a British die-cast toy distributor turned manufacturer